Jakub Maxa (born April 23, 1989) is a Czech professional ice hockey player. He played with HC Litvínov in the Czech Extraliga during the 2010–11 Czech Extraliga season.

References

External links

1989 births
Czech ice hockey forwards
HC Litvínov players
Living people
HC Most players